Steve Luatua (born 29 April 1991) is a New Zealand rugby union player. His regular playing position is either as a lock or a loose forward. He plays for the Bristol Bears in the English Premiership.

Luatua was a member of the New Zealand under 20 team which won the 2010 and 2011 IRB Junior World Championship.

After a strong start to the 2013 Super Rugby season, Luatua was named in the initial All Blacks wider training squad.

He made his All Blacks debut coming from the bench in the 24–9 victory versus France in New Plymouth on 22 June 2013.

He was selected for the All Blacks 2013 The Rugby Championship squad and played his first full test in the 47–29 win against Australia, in Sydney, on 17 August 2013.

On 23 August 2014, he scored his first international test try against Australia coming from the bench by a pass from the prop Charlie Faumuina leading to a win, 51–20.

After many struggled with keeping form and having injuries, Luatua was re-selected for New Zealand after two years' absence for the All Blacks' end-of-year tour in 2016. Luatua started as number 8 against Italy, scoring a try, New Zealand winning the match 68–10.

In February 2017, English Premiership side Bristol announced Luatua would be joining them for the 2017–18 season. Luatua served a 5-week suspension after being red carded for a high tackle on Tim Nanai-Williams from the Chiefs when Williams wasn't in possession of the ball. For the rest of the 2017 Super Rugby campaign Luatua was excellent, providing a game-winning offload to Sonny Bill Williams who subsequently offloaded to Ihaia West so that West could score against the British and Irish Lions. The Blues won 22–16. The following day however, Luatua was not selected for the All Blacks, meaning the Blues' 22–16 win against the Lions would be his last match at Eden Park.

Outside rugby 
Luatua is an avid New England Patriots fan. He covered the NFL playoffs in 2017 for Duke TV.

References

External links 

 Blues player profile
 Auckland player profile

1991 births
New Zealand rugby union players
New Zealand sportspeople of Samoan descent
New Zealand international rugby union players
New Zealand expatriate sportspeople in England
Rugby union locks
Rugby union flankers
Blues (Super Rugby) players
Auckland rugby union players
Bristol Bears players
Rugby union players from Auckland
People educated at Mount Albert Grammar School
Living people
Barbarian F.C. players